Queens! Destiny of Dance is a 2011 Bollywood drama film directed by David Atkins, starring Seema Biswas as Guru Amma, with Laxmi Narayan Tripathi, Raj Zutshi, Archanna Guptaa and South Indian actor Vineeth as Mukta. Even though the film won several international awards, it was a box office failure.

Summary

Queens! Destiny of Dance is the story of an upmarket hijra community that is headed by their queen, Guru Amma.

Cast

Seema Biswas - Guru Amma
Vineeth - Mukta
Laxmi Narayan Tripathi - Lajo
Raj Zutshi - Hakim
Archanna Guptaa - Nandini
Rushabh Ruparel - mukta (when was a young child)

Production
Transgender activist Laxmi Narayan Tripathi met the director David Atkins in 2001 and asked him to make a film on hijras. After a research, the director confirmed the project and contacted Tripathi to support the project, titled as Queens! Destiny Of Dance, and she happily agreed. National award winner Seema Biswas and South Indian actor Vineeth were signed to play key roles along with Laxmi Narayan Tripathi as well as Archanna Guptaa, with veteran actor Raj Zutshi was also signed for a small role.

References

External links
 

Indian LGBT-related films
2011 LGBT-related films
2011 films
Transgender-related films